J.Piin Mall is a shopping mall located in East District, Hsinchu City, Taiwan that opened on October 29, 2016. The 1st to 3rd floors house stores offering international sports brands, electronic products, and local cultural and creative industries. The 12th to 13th floors are a food court. The public square of the department store showcases some of the public artworks created by the Taiwanese artist Jimmy Liao.

Gallery

See also
 List of tourist attractions in Taiwan

References

External links

2016 establishments in Taiwan
Shopping malls in Hsinchu City
Shopping malls established in 2016